"Stay (Don't Go Away)" is a song by French DJ David Guetta featuring British singer Raye and was released on 9 May 2019. The track became Guetta's eighth number one and Raye's first on Billboards Dance/Mix Show Airplay chart in its 13 July 2019 issue.

Charts

Weekly charts

Year-end charts

Certifications

References

2019 singles
2019 songs
David Guetta songs
Songs written by David Guetta
Songs written by Carl Falk
Songs written by Raye (singer)
Songs written by Kennedi Lykken
Song recordings produced by David Guetta